

Mongolia is divided into 21 provinces or aimags and one provincial municipality. Each aimag is subdivided into several districts.
The modern provinces have been established since 1921.  The capital, Ulaanbaatar, is governed as an independent provincial municipality separate from Töv Province, inside which it is situated.

List of provinces

See also 
ISO 3166-2 codes for Mongolia
List of political and geographic subdivisions by total area
List of Mongolian provinces by GDP

References

External links 
 Provinces of Mongolia at statoids.com

 
Subdivisions of Mongolia
Mongolia, Provinces
Mongolia 1
Provinces, Mongolia
Mongolia geography-related lists

cs:Ajmag